Milliner is a surname. Notable people with the surname include:

 Bertie Milliner (1911–1975), Australian politician
 Dee Milliner (born 1991), American football player
 Eugene Milliner (1878–1921), baseballer
 Glen Milliner (born 1948), Australian politician, son of Bertie